Pseudatteria splendens is a species of moth of the family Tortricidae first described by Herbert Druce in 1901. It is found in Ecuador, Colombia, Peru and Brazil.

It is a variable species, varying in some elements of the wing pattern, as well as in the reduction and/or division into smaller portions. The most constant external character consists of two costal streaks in the outer half of the forewing.

References

Moths described in 1901
Pseudatteria